The Anisfield School of Business is a business education institution located at Ramapo College of New Jersey. By educating students through business disciplines and liberal arts, the school has been a fixture at Ramapo College since 1979.

Ramapo College